Skakavac (lit. "grasshopper") is a waterfall formed on the Perućica, a mountain creek, in the Perućica, which is regulated as a Strict Nature Reserve as part of Sutjeska National Park in Bosnia and Herzegovina.

The Perućica primeval forest of beech and spruce is situated beneath Maglić (2,386 m), the highest peak in Bosnia and Herzegovina, and separated from Zelengora mountain by the canyon of the Sutjeska river.  Perućica creek cuts through the Perućica forest and descends between two steep Maglić slopes. Near the middle of its course, the stream cascades from the upper hanging valley to the lower valley, falling 75 meters from a karstic limestone precipice to reach its confluence with the Sutjeska river in the valley of Tjentište.

References

External links

Official website of National Park Sutjeska 

Waterfalls of Bosnia and Herzegovina
Protected areas of Bosnia and Herzegovina
Tourist attractions in Bosnia and Herzegovina
Tourism in Bosnia and Herzegovina